Trevarthen is a surname. Notable people with the surname include:

Colwyn Trevarthen (born 1931), British child psychologist
William Trevarthen (1878–1927), New Zealand rugby footballer